Charles Drysdale may refer to:

 Charles Douglas Drysdale (1915–1984), Scottish nationalist activist
 Charles Robert Drysdale (1829–1907), British physician
 Charles Vickery Drysdale (1874–1961), British electrical engineer and social reformer